Gretchen Quintana Cordero (also Grechin Quintana; born June 30, 1984 in San Cristóbal, Pinar del Río) is a female heptathlete from Cuba, who competed for her native country at the 2008 Summer Olympics.

Personal bests
Heptathlon: 6076 pts –  Caracas, 10/11 May 2007

Achievements

References

External links

1984 births
Living people
Cuban heptathletes
Athletes (track and field) at the 2007 Pan American Games
Athletes (track and field) at the 2008 Summer Olympics
Athletes (track and field) at the 2011 Pan American Games
Olympic athletes of Cuba
People from Pinar del Río
Pan American Games silver medalists for Cuba
Pan American Games medalists in athletics (track and field)
Central American and Caribbean Games bronze medalists for Cuba
Competitors at the 2006 Central American and Caribbean Games
Central American and Caribbean Games medalists in athletics
Medalists at the 2007 Pan American Games